Clovis Kamzong Abessolo (born October 9, 1991) is a Cameroonian cyclist riding for the SNH Velo Club.

Major results

2012
 4th Overall Tour du Cameroun
 4th Overall Grand Prix Chantal Biya
2014
 3rd Overall Grand Prix Chantal Biya
1st Stage 3
 5th Overall Tour du Cameroun
1st  Young rider classification
1st Stage 4
2015
 1st  Overall Tour du Cameroun
1st  Points classification
1st Stages 1 & 3
 1st Stage 2 Grand Prix Chantal Biya
2016
 1st Stage 3 Tour du Cameroun
 6th Overall Grand Prix Chantal Biya
 7th Overall Tour de Côte d'Ivoire
2017
 1st  Overall Grand Prix Chantal Biya
1st Stage 2
2018
 1st Stage 1 Tour du Cameroun
 2nd Overall Grand Prix Chantal Biya
1st  Points classification
1st Stage 5
 2nd Overall Tour de Côte d'Ivoire
 10th Overall Tour du Faso
2019
 5th Overall Tour du Cameroun
1st Stages 2 & 8
 8th Overall Grand Prix Chantal Biya
2020
 1st Stage 4 La Tropicale Amissa Bongo
 3rd Overall Grand Prix Chantal Biya
2021
 1st Overall Tour du Cameroun

References

1991 births
Living people
Cameroonian male cyclists